Ridley Park station is a station along the Northeast Corridor. Amtrak does not stop here; only SEPTA's Wilmington/Newark Line trains serve this station. It is located at Hinckley & Morton Avenues in Ridley Park, Pennsylvania, and contains a one-story station house similar to that of Media Regional Rail station built into the embankment next to a platform, as well as a passenger drop-off area at Hinckley Avenue and Lincoln Street. Another platform also exists on the opposite side of the tracks on Ridley & Morton Avenues. Access between the two platforms is available from the nearby Ward Street Bridge just west of the station.

The current Ridley Park station was built by the Pennsylvania Railroad as a replacement for a much more elaborate station house which was built over the tracks by the Philadelphia, Wilmington and Baltimore Railroad during the 19th century. The current station building opened in 1942 and was designed by architect Lester C. Tichy in association with designer Raymond Loewy. Historic photographs and architectural drawings of the Ridley Park station can be found in the March 1943 issue of The Architectural Forum magazine.

Station layout
Ridley Park has two low-level side platforms with walkways connecting passengers to the inner tracks. Amtrak's Northeast Corridor lines bypass the station via the inner tracks.

References

External links
SEPTA - Ridley Park Station
2003 Mike Pizzano photo
 Station from Google Maps Street View

SEPTA Regional Rail stations
Stations on the Northeast Corridor
Railway stations in Delaware County, Pennsylvania
Former Pennsylvania Railroad stations
Railway stations in the United States opened in 1871
Wilmington/Newark Line